Gu Yasha (born 28 November 1990 in Zhengzhou, Henan) is a Chinese football player who competed for the national team in the 2008 Summer Olympics. Her position is midfielder.

International goals

Major performances
2004 National U16 Championship – 1st
2006/2007 National U18 League – 1st/2nd
2007 National Championship – 2nd
2008 Asian Cup – 2nd

See also
 List of women's footballers with 100 or more caps

References

External links
 
http://2008teamchina.olympic.cn/index.php/personview/personsen/5305
https://web.archive.org/web/20080810130812/http://results.beijing2008.cn/WRM/ENG/BIO/Athlete/7/236627.shtml

1990 births
Living people
Hui sportspeople
Chinese women's footballers
China women's international footballers
Footballers at the 2008 Summer Olympics
Footballers from Henan
Olympic footballers of China
2015 FIFA Women's World Cup players
Footballers at the 2016 Summer Olympics
People from Zhengzhou
Women's association football midfielders
Footballers at the 2010 Asian Games
Footballers at the 2014 Asian Games
Beijing BG Phoenix F.C. players
FIFA Century Club
Footballers at the 2018 Asian Games
Asian Games silver medalists for China
Asian Games medalists in football
Medalists at the 2018 Asian Games
2019 FIFA Women's World Cup players